Family with sequence similarity 84 member B is a protein that in humans is encoded by the FAM84B gene.

References

Further reading